Stephenie G.A. Scialabba (born ) is an American attorney and politician. A Republican, she has represented the 12th District in the Pennsylvania House of Representatives since 2023.

Early life and education
Scialabba was born and raised in Western Pennsylvania. In 2009, she graduated from Bishop McCort High School. Scialabba earned a dual major Bachelor of Arts degree in political science and history from the University of Pittsburgh in 2012, and a Juris Doctor degree from the University's School of Law in 2016.

Political career
In 2022, Scialabba ran to represent the Pennsylvania House of Representatives 12th District with the support of retiring incumbent Daryl Metcalfe, defeating Democrat Robert Vigue in the general election. 

In 2023, Scialabba lead a successful effort to end Butler County, Pennsylvania's status as a "sanctuary county."

Personal life
Scialabba is married to her husband, John C. Scialabba, and has one child. She resides in Cranberry Township, Butler County, Pennsylvania.

Electoral history

References

Living people
Republican Party members of the Pennsylvania House of Representatives
21st-century American politicians
Year of birth missing (living people)